Schinia sanrafaeli is a moth of the family Noctuidae. It is found in North America, including Utah and western New Mexico.

The wingspan is 20–21 mm.

External links
Images

Schinia
Moths of North America
Moths described in 2004